San Lorenzo is a Baroque-style Roman Catholic church building in Melfi, province of Potenza, region of Basilicata, Italy.

The octagonal church was initially built in the 1000s by the Byzantine rulers of the city, and was soon occupied by canons belonging to the nearby Abbey of Monticchio. In 1500, it became a parish church. The church has suffered damage over the centuries from the earthquakes. The present portal and long stairs appears to date to the 17th century. The adjacent bell-tower, rebuilt in the 14th century by the family of Niccolo Acciaiuoli, has since collapsed, and only the base remains. In 2015, the church underwent refurbishment including demolishing a parish house built to the left of the entrance portal.

References

Gothic architecture in Italy
Churches in the province of Potenza
17th-century Roman Catholic church buildings in Italy
Octagonal churches in Italy